Juan de Zurbarán (1620–1649), was a Spanish Baroque painter.

Juan de Zurbarán was born in Llerena, Badajoz, the son of Francisco de Zurbarán (1598–1664), and joined in the workshop that his father owned in Seville, with which it is likely they collaborated on different paintings, including the Still Life with Jug and Cups. The parental influence is evident in his work, but also his style reflects Dutch, Lombard and Neapolitan influences. He primarily painted still life genre.

Some of his works include Still Life with Fruit and Goldfinch and Still Life with Basket of Apples, Quinces and Pomegranates, preserved in the Museu Nacional d'Art de Catalunya, the Flowers and Fruits in Chinese Porcelain of the Art Institute of Chicago, and the Plate with Apple and Orange Blossoms in a private collection, among other works autographed or attributed.

In 1641 he married Mariana de Cuadros, daughter of a rich merchant, who died soon after. Juan de Zurbarán's career was cut short by his early death at age 29. He contracted the plague during the epidemic that ravaged Sevilla in 1649 and was killed along with several of his brothers.

External links and references
 National Museum of Catalan Art, Museo Nacional del Prado, BBVA (ed.): "Still Lifes" (Spanish)

1620 births
1649 deaths
17th-century Spanish painters
Spanish male painters